Víctor Fragola (6 August 1917 – March 2010) was an Argentine sailor. He competed in the Star event at the 1960 Summer Olympics.

References

External links
 

1917 births
2010 deaths
Argentine male sailors (sport)
Olympic sailors of Argentina
Sailors at the 1960 Summer Olympics – Star
Sportspeople from Buenos Aires